Almost a Lady is a 1926 American silent romantic comedy film directed by E. Mason Hopper and starring Marie Prevost.

Cast
Marie Prevost as Marcia Blake, a gownshop model
Harrison Ford as William Duke
George K. Arthur as Bob
Trixie Friganza as Mrs. Reilly
John Miljan as Henri
Barney Gilmore as Mr. Reilly

Preservation
Prints of Almost a Lady survive at the French archive Centre national du cinéma et de l'image animée in Fort de Bois-d'Arcy and the UCLA Film and Television Archive.

References

External links

1926 films
American silent feature films
Films directed by E. Mason Hopper
1926 romantic comedy films
Producers Distributing Corporation films
American black-and-white films
American romantic comedy films
1920s American films
Silent romantic comedy films
Silent American comedy films
1920s English-language films